John Raphael Lundon (26 November 1868 – 6 October 1957) was a New Zealand cricketer. He played four first-class matches for Auckland between 1892 and 1894.

In later life he was active in civic affairs in Auckland. He stood perennially for the Auckland City Council and Auckland Hospital and Charitable Aid Board as an independent candidate. Only once was he successful, winning a seat on the Auckland City Council in 1929, he was defeated in 1931 and never regained a seat.

See also
 List of Auckland representative cricketers

References

External links
 

1868 births
1957 deaths
New Zealand cricketers
Auckland cricketers
Cricketers from Auckland
Auckland City Councillors
20th-century New Zealand politicians